is the chairman of the giant Japanese toy, children's merchandise and entertainment company, Tomy Company, Ltd. (known as Takara Tomy in Japanese).

Kantaro Tomiyama was born in 1954 in Tokyo, Japan and is the grandson of the founder of Tomy, Eiichiro Tomiyama.  In 1982, Kantaro entered Tomy after graduation from University of Hull in Britain.  He became president of Tomy in 1986. He was succeeded by Harold Meij in 2015.

References 

1954 births
Living people
Businesspeople from Tokyo
Japanese chief executives
Takara Tomy
Alumni of the University of Hull